The demographics of Malaysia are represented by the multiple ethnic groups that exist in the country. Malaysia's population, according to the 2010 census, is 28,334,000 including non-citizens, which makes it the 42nd most populated country in the world. Of these, 5.72 million live in East Malaysia and 22.5 million live in Peninsular Malaysia.

The Malaysian population is growing at a rate of 1.94% per annum as of 2017. According to latest projection of the 2010 census, the fertility rates of the 3 largest Malaysian groups are as follows: Malay/Bumiputera: 2.4 children per woman, Chinese: 1.4 children per woman and Indian: 1.8 children per woman. Malay fertility rates are 40% higher than Malaysian Indians and 56% higher than Malaysian Chinese. Population projections in 2017 show that the Malays and Bumiputeras comprised a total of 68.8% of the total population, Chinese 23.2% and Indians 7.0%. The Chinese population has shrunk proportionally from 1957, when it was about 40% of Malaya, although in absolute numbers they have increased around threefold by 2017 in Malaysia (2.4 million in 1957 to 6.6 million in 2017, the later figure include East Malaysia) but have been dwarfed by the fivefold increase of Malays (from around 3.1 million in 1957 to 15.5 million in 2017).

Demographic trends and key rates
Censuses were taken in Malaysia in 1970, 1980, 1991, 2000 and 2010. The total population is around 28.3 million according to the 2010 census. The population distribution is highly uneven, with some 20 million residents concentrated in Peninsula Malaysia. 74.7% of the population is urban. Due to the rise in labour-intensive industries, Malaysia is estimated to have over 3 million migrant workers, which is about 10% of the Malaysian population. The exact numbers are unknown: there are a million legal foreign workers and perhaps another million unauthorised foreigners. The state of Sabah alone had nearly 25% of its 2.7 million population listed as illegal foreign workers in the last census. Sabah based NGOs estimate that out of the 3 million population, 2 million are illegal immigrants.

Additionally, according to the World Refugee Survey 2008, published by the US Committee for Refugees and Immigrants (USCRI), Malaysia hosts a population of refugees and asylum seekers numbering approximately 155,700. Of this population, approximately 70,500 refugees and asylum seekers are from the Philippines, 69,700 from Burma, and 21,800 from Indonesia. The USCRI named Malaysia as one of the ten worst places for refugees on account of the country's discriminatory practices toward them. Malaysian officials are reported to have turned deportees directly over to human smugglers in 2007, and Malaysia employs RELA, a volunteer militia, to enforce its immigration law.

Population distribution by states and territories

Source: National Census 2000, Department of Statistics Malaysia.

In 2000

 Putrajaya data is for 2004.
 Population estimates are rounded to the nearest hundred.

In 2010

Source: National Census 2010, Department of Statistics Malaysia

In 2020

Source: National Census 2020, Department of Statistics Malaysia

Population age distribution trends for 2001–2016

Data from July 2010.

Structure of the population 

Structure of the population (01.07.2011) (Estimates – Data refer to projections based on the 2018 Population Census):

Structure of the population (2015 estimates) :

Population Estimates by Sex and Age Group (01.VII.2020):

Key demographic rates
 Population growth rate^: 1.542% (2012 data)
 Age Structure^:
 0–14 years: 23.0% (male 4,118,086/female 3,884,403)
 15–64 years: 69.6% (male 7,838,166/female 7,785,833)
 65 years and over: 7.4% (male 1,458,038/female 1,418,280) (2021 est.)
 Net migration rate: -0.37 migrant(s)/1,000 population (2012 est.)
 note: does not reflect net flow of an unknown number of illegal immigrants from other countries in the region
 Human sex ratio:
 at birth: 1.07 male(s)/female
 under 15 years: 1.06 male(s)/female
 15–64 years: 1.03 male(s)/female
 65 years and over: 0.89 male(s)/female
 total population: 1.03 male(s)/female (2012 est.)
 Infant mortality rate:^ 14.57 deaths/1,000 live births (2012 data)
 Life expectancy at birth:
 total population: 74.04 years (at 1:1 male-to-female ratio)
 male: ^ 71.28 years (2012 data)
 female: ^ 76.99 years (2012 data)
 Total fertility rate:
 2.64 children born/woman (2012 est.)
In 1987, Malays had a TFR of 4.51, Chinese had TFR of 2.25 and Indians had TFR of 2.77. The corresponding figures in Singapore was 2.16, 1.48 and 1.95.

Data for (^) obtained from Department of Statistics releases. See notes. All key rates sampled per 1000 of population.

Vital statistics

UN estimates 

Data from United Nation:

Registered births and deaths

Data from Department of Statistics Malaysia:

Current vital statistics

Total fertility rate by ethnic group

Total fertility rate by state
Total fertility rate (TFR) by state according to year:

Life expectancy at birth 

Average life expectancy at age 0 of the total population.

Ethnolinguistic groups
Malaysia's population comprises many ethnic groups. People of Austronesian origin make up the majority of the population, and are known as the Bumiputras. Large Chinese and Indian minorities also exist. Malays, as Bumiputra, see Malaysia as their land, and since race riots in 1969, Bumiputra have been especially privileged in Malaysia – top government positions are reserved for Malays, and the Malays received cheaper housing, priority in government jobs as well as business licenses. However, since the riot, racial stability has prevailed, if not full harmony, and mixed marriages are on the rise. In the 2010 census, 68.8 per cent of the population were considered bumiputera, 23.2 per cent Malaysian Chinese, and 7 per cent Malaysian Indian. In 2021 these were figures were 69.7 per cent bumiputera, 22.5 per cent Chinese, and 6.8 per cent Indian.

Bumiputras

Bumiputras totaling 68.8% of Malaysia's population as of 2017 are divided into Muslim Malays proper, who make up the majority of the Malaysian population at 54.66%; and other bumiputra, who make up 14.14% of the Malaysian population, and most of whom belong to various Austronesian ethnic groups related to the Muslim Malays. Bumiputra status is also accorded to certain non-Malay indigenous peoples, including ethnic Thais, Khmers, Chams and the natives of Sabah and Sarawak. Laws over who gets Bumiputra status vary between states. Some Eurasians can obtain bumiputra privileges, providing they can prove they are of Portuguese (Kristang) descent.

Malays

The Malays are an ethnic group predominantly inhabiting the Malay Peninsula and parts of Sumatra and Borneo. They form the largest community in Malaysia and play a dominant role politically. They make up about half of the total population. By constitutional definition, Malays are Muslims who practice Malay customs (adat) and culture.

Their language, Malay (Bahasa Melayu), is the national language of the country. Citizens of Minangkabau, Bugis or Javanese origins, who can be classified "Malay" under constitutional definitions may also speak their respective ancestral tongues. However, English is also widely spoken in major towns and cities across the country. Malays from different states in Malaysia carry distinct dialects that can sometimes be unintelligible to most of their fellow countrymen. By definition of the Malaysian constitution, all Malays are Muslims.

In the past, Malays wrote in Pallava or using the Sanskrit-based alphabet of Kawi. Arabic traders later introduced Jawi, an Arabic-based script, which became popular after the 15th century. Until then reading and writing were mostly the preserve of scholars and nobility, while most Malay commoners were illiterate. Jawi was taught along with Islam, allowing the script to spread through all social classes. Nevertheless, Kawi remained in use by the upper-class well into the 15th century. The Romanised script was introduced during the colonial period and, over time, it came to replace both Sanskrit and Jawi. This was largely due to the influence of the European education system, wherein children were taught the Latin alphabet.

Malay culture shows strong influences from Buddhism, Hinduism and animism. However, since the Islamisation movement of the 1980s and 90s, these aspects are often neglected or banned altogether. Because any Malay-speaking Muslim is entitled to Bumiputra privileges, many non-Malay Muslims have adopted the Malay language, customs and attire in the last few decades. This is particularly the case with Indian Muslims from the peninsula and the Kedayan of Borneo. The Malay ethnic group is distinct from the concept of a Malay race, which encompasses a wider group of people, including most of Indonesia and the Philippines.

Other Bumiputras

Malaysia has many other non-Malay indigenous people, who are given Bumiputra status. The indigenous tribes are the oldest inhabitants of Malaysia, and the indigenous groups of Peninsular Malaysia are known collectively as Orang Asli and in East Malaysia as "Orang Asal". They account for about 11 percent of the nation's population, and represent a majority in East Malaysia of Sabah and Sarawak. In Sarawak, the dominant tribal group are the Dayak people, who are either Iban (also known as Sea Dayak) or Bidayuh (also known as Land Dayak) of which are mainly Christians. The Iban form the largest of all indigenous groups, numbering over 600,000 (35% of Sarawak's population), who mostly still live in traditional longhouses which can hold up to 200 people. Longhouses are mostly places along the Rajang and Lupar rivers and their tributaries, although many Iban have moved to the cities. The Bidayuhs, numbering around 170,000, are concentrated in the southwestern part of Sarawak. They, together with other indigenous groups in Sarawak make up over half of the states population.

The largest indigenous tribe in Sabah is the Kadazan, most of whom are Christians and rice farmers. They live as subsistence farmers. Sabah has a large number of indigenous people, 19.3% of the population are Kadazan-Dusuns, and 16.5% are Bajaus.

There also exist aboriginal groups in much smaller numbers on the peninsula, where they are collectively known as Orang Asli (literally meaning "original person"). The 140,000 Orang Asli comprise a number of different ethnic communities. Many tribes, both on the peninsula and in Borneo, were traditionally nomadic or semi-nomadic hunter—gatherers who practice animism, including the Punan, Penan and Senoi. However, their ancestral land and hunting grounds are commonly reclaimed by the state, shifting them to inferior land and sometimes pushing them out of their traditional way of life. The most numerous of the Orang Asli are called Negritos and are related to native Papuans in West Papua, Indonesia and Papua New Guinea, and possibly even to the aborigines in Australia. Other bumiputera minorities to a lesser degree include the Malaysian Siamese, Khmers, Chams, Burmese and the Indian Muslims commonly known as Mamaks.

Non-Bumiputras

Minorities who lack Bumiputra status have established themselves in Malaysia.  Those who are not considered to be Bumiputras make up a considerable portion of the Malaysian population – non-Malays once constituted around 50% of the population of peninsula Malaya (1947–1957), but have since declined in percentage term due to a higher birthrate of Malays owing to favorable policies by the government as well as some degree of out-migration by the Chinese. A large number of the non-Bumiputra arrived during the colonial period, but most of the non-Bumiputras were native-born by 1947 as large-scale immigration had effectively ceased by the late 1940s. Some Chinese families, known as Peranakan ("straits-born"), have resided in Malaysia since as far back as 15th century Malacca.

Chinese

The second largest ethnic group at 6.69 million are the Chinese who make up 23% of the population excluding non-citizens as of 2018. They have been dominant in trade and business since the early 20th century. Malaysian Chinese businesses developed as part of the larger bamboo network, a network of overseas Chinese businesses operating in the markets of Southeast Asia that share common family and cultural ties. George Town, Ipoh and Iskandar Puteri are Chinese-majority cities, while Penang was the only state in Malaysia with a non-Bumiputera majority population. The Chinese have been settling in Malaysia for many centuries, as seen in the emergence of the Peranakan culture, but the exodus peaked during the nineteenth century through trading and tin-mining. When they first arrived, the Chinese often worked the most grueling jobs like tin mining and railway construction. Later on, some of them owned businesses that became large conglomerates in today's Malaysia. Most Chinese are Tao Buddhist and retain strong cultural ties to their ancestral homeland.

The first Chinese people to settle in the Straits Settlements, primarily in and around Malacca, gradually adopted elements of Malayan culture, and some intermarried with the Malayan community. A distinct sub-ethnic group called babas (male) and nyonyas (female) emerged. Babas and nyonyas as a group are known as Peranakan. They produced a syncretic set of practices, beliefs, and arts, combining Malay and Chinese traditions in such a way as to create a new culture. The Peranakan culture is still visible to this day in the former Straits Settlements of Singapore, Malacca and Penang.

The Chinese community in Malaysia, depending on the predominant dialect in a particular region, speaks a variety of Chinese dialects including Mandarin, Hokkien, Cantonese, Hakka and Teochew. In certain regions in Malaysia, some dialects are more widely used; Hokkien predominates in Penang and Kedah, while most Chinese in the former centres of tin mining, such as Ipoh and Kuala Lumpur, speak Cantonese. More recently, however, with the standardised, compulsory use of Mandarin in Chinese schools, a huge majority of Malaysian Chinese now speak Mandarin, a non-native language that originated from northern China.

On the other hand, it was reported that up to 10% of Malaysian Chinese are primarily English-speaking. The English-speaking Chinese minority is typically concentrated in cities such as Kuala Lumpur, Petaling Jaya, Subang Jaya, Johor Bahru, George Town, Ipoh and Malacca. The English speakers form a distinct subset within the larger Chinese community, as they are known to have a less Sinocentric mindset, and are rather Westernized in thinking and attitudes.

Indian

The 2.01 million strong Indian community in Malaysia is the smallest of the three main ethnic groups, comprising only 7.0% of the total population excluding non-citizens as of 2017. Indians were brought in to Malaysia during the British colonial period in late 18th century and early 19th centuries. They first came to Malaya for barter trade, especially in the former Straits Settlements of Singapore, Malacca and Penang. During the British colonial rule, Indian labourers, who were mostly south Indian Tamils from Tamil Nadu and some Telugus and Malayalis from other parts of South India, were brought to Malaya to work on sugarcane and coffee plantations, rubber and oil palm estates, construction of buildings, railways, roads and bridges. English-educated Ceylon Tamils from Ceylon (now Sri Lanka), and some Malaysian Telugus and Malayalees (from Kerala) were brought in to handle white-collar jobs. Kerala had the first mission schools in India and as such produced English educated administrators. Both ethnicities worked mainly as clerks, public servants, teachers, hospital assistants, doctors and in other skilled professions. As for the Punjabis from Punjab, most of them where enlisted in the army in Malaya while some handled the bullock-cart services in the country.

The Indians who came to Malaysia brought with them the Hindu religion, its unique temples called Kovils and the Sikhs with their Gurdwaras. Tamil cuisine is hugely popular. More than 86% of Malaysian Indians adhere to Hinduism. The Chitty community in Malacca are descendants of much earlier Indian immigrants who adopted local culture. Though they remain Hindu, the Chitties speak Bahasa Malaysia and women dress in sarong kebayas. The Hindu community celebrates two main festivals — Deepavali and Thaipusam — and many other smaller religious events each year. Both ethnic Telugu people and Malayalees from Andhra Pradesh and Kerala celebrate the Ugadi festival (new year) and Onam. The ethnic Punjabis celebrate Vasakhi, Lodi and Gurpurab. Majority of the Indians in Malaysia speak Tamil (also lingua franca among all Indians) while Telugu, Malayalam and Punjabi are also spoken  by minorities.

Others
A small minority of Malaysians do not fit into the broader ethnic groups. A small population exists of people of European and Middle Eastern descent. Europeans and Middle Easterners, who first arrived during the colonial period, assimilated through intermarriage into the Christian and Muslim communities. Most Eurasian Malaysians trace their ancestry to British, Dutch and/or Portuguese colonists, and there is a strong Kristang community in Malacca.

The Nepalese are mostly migrant workers from Nepal totalling 356,199 of which Malaysian Citizens are as little over 600 and lives in Rawang, Selangor. Originally brought by the British as bodyguards and security personnel, Nepali population consist of Rana, Chettri, Rai and Gurung clans. Other minorities include Filipinos and Burmese. A small number of ethnic Vietnamese from Cambodia and Vietnam settled in Malaysia as Vietnam War refugees.

There is no general consensus on the ethnic profiling of children of mixed parentage. Some choose to be identified according to paternal ethnicity while others simply think that they fall in the "Others" category. The majority choose to identify themselves as Malay as long as either parent is Malay, mainly due to the legal definition of Bumiputra and the privileges that comes along with it. Children of Chinese–Indian parentage are known as Chindians. Though this is not an official category in national census data, it is an increasing number especially in urban areas due to the increasing ethnic Chinese-Indian relationships.

Many other people from around the world have moved to Malaysia. There are over 70,000 Africans who have emigrated to Malaysia.

Languages

Malaysia contains speakers of 137 living languages, 41 of which are found in Peninsula Malaysia. The official language of Malaysia is known as Bahasa Malaysia, a standardised form of the Malay language. English was, for a protracted period, the de facto, administrative language of Malaysia, though its status was later rescinded. Despite that, English remains an active second language in many areas of Malaysian society and is taught as a compulsory subject in all public schools. Many businesses in Malaysia conduct their transactions in English, and it is sometimes used in official correspondence. Examinations are based on British English, although there has been much American influence through television.

Malaysian English, also known as Malaysian Standard English (MySE), is a form of English derived from British English, although there is little official use of the term, except with relation to education. Malaysian English also sees wide use in business, along with Manglish, which is a colloquial form of English with heavy Malay, Chinese languages and Tamil influences. Most Malaysians are conversant in English, although some are only fluent in the Manglish form. The Malaysian government officially discourages the use of Manglish.

Malaysian Chinese mostly speak Chinese languages from the southern provinces of China. The more common languages in Peninsular Malaysia are Hokkien, Cantonese, Hakka, Teochew, Hainanese, and Hokchiu. In Sarawak, most ethnic Chinese speak either Fuzhounese or Hakka while Hakka predominates in Sabah except in the city of Sandakan where Cantonese is more often spoken despite the Hakka-origins of the Chinese residing there. Hokkien is mostly spoken in Penang, Kedah and Perlis, whereas Cantonese is mostly spoken in Ipoh and Kuala Lumpur. However, in Malaysia as a whole, the majority of ethnic Chinese now speak Mandarin, a non-native language from northern China (originally spoken by the Beijing elite and chosen as the official language of China), as their first language, while English is the first language for the rest. Some of the less-spoken languages such as Hainanese are facing extinction. As with Malaysian youths of other races, most Chinese youth are multilingual and can speak up to four languages with at least moderate fluency – their native Chinese language, Mandarin, English and Malay.

Tamil is the most common language spoken among Indians in Malaysia, especially in Peninsular Malaysia where they still maintain close cultural ties with their homeland Tamil Nadu & Ceylon . This is because there are far fewer Indians in East Malaysia than in the Peninsula. Tamil community from Ceylon have their own Tamil dialect known as Sri Lankan Tamil. Besides Tamil, the Malayalam Language is spoken by over 200,000 Malayalees in Malaysia, predominantly in Perak, Selangor, Negeri Sembilan and Johore. Telugu is also spoken by the Telugu community. Punjabi language is commonly spoken by the Punjabi community. Besides that, Sinhala is used by a small number of Sinhalese community from Sri Lanka.

Citizens of Minangkabau, Bugis or Javanese origins, who can be classified "Malay" under constitutional definitions may also speak their respective ancestral tongues. The native tribes of East Malaysia have their own languages which are related to, but easily distinguishable from, Malay. The Iban is the main tribal language in Sarawak while Dusunic languages are spoken by the natives in Sabah. A variant of the Malay language that is spoken in Brunei is also commonly spoken in both states.

Some Malaysians have Caucasian ancestry and speak creole languages, such as the Portuguese-based Malaccan Creoles, and the Spanish-based Zamboangueño Chavacano. Thai is also spoken in some areas.

Citizenship

Citizenship is usually granted by lex soli. Citizenship in the states of Sabah and Sarawak in Malaysian Borneo are distinct from citizenship in Peninsular Malaysia for immigration purposes. Every citizen is issued a biometric smart chip identity card, known as MyKad, at the age of 12, and must carry the card at all times.

Religion

Islam is the largest and state religion of Malaysia, although Malaysia is a multi-religious society and the Malaysian constitution guarantees religious freedom. Despite the recognition of Islam as the state religion, the first 4 prime ministers have stressed that Malaysia could function as a secular state. According to the Population and Housing Census 2020 figures, approximately 63.5 percent of the population practised Islam; 18.7 percent Buddhism; 9.1 percent Christianity; 6.1 percent Hinduism; and 2.7 percent practise other religions or reported having no religion or did not provide any information. The percentage population of Muslims has been steadily increasing – from 58.6% in 1991, 60.4% in 2000, 61.5% in 2010, to 63.5% of the 2020 census.

The majority of Malaysian Indians follow Hinduism (84.5%), with a significant minority identifying as Christians (7.7%), Sikhs (3.9%), Muslims (3.8%), and 1,000 Jains. Most Malaysian Chinese follow a combination of Buddhism, Taoism, Confucianism and ancestor-worship but, when pressed to specify their religion, will identify themselves as Buddhists. Statistics from the 2000 Census indicate that 75.9% of Malaysia's ethnic Chinese identify as Buddhist, with significant numbers of adherents following Taoism (10.6%) and Christianity (9.6%), along with small Hui-Muslim populations in areas like Penang. Christianity constitutes a slim majority of the non-Malay Bumiputra community (50.1%) with an additional 36.3% identifying as Muslims while 7.3% follow folk religion.

Islam

Islam is thought to have been brought to Malaysia around the 12th century by Arab traders. Since then the religion has become the predominant religion of the country and is recognised as the state's official religion. All ethnic Malays are considered Muslim by Article 160 of the Constitution of Malaysia.

Muslims are obliged to follow the decisions of Syariah courts in matters concerning their religion. The Islamic judges are expected to follow the Shafi`i legal school of Islam, which is the main madh'hab of Malaysia. The jurisdiction of Shariah courts is limited only to Muslims in matters such as marriage, inheritance, divorce, apostasy, religious conversion, and custody among others. No other criminal or civil offences are under the jurisdiction of the Shariah courts, which have a similar hierarchy to the Civil Courts. Despite being the supreme courts of the land, the Civil Courts (including the Federal Court) do not hear matters related to Islamic practices, as ratified by Tun Dr Mahathir Mohamad in the late 1980s. Regulation of sexual activities among the Muslim population is strict; with laws prohibiting unmarried couples from occupying a secluded area or a confined space to prevent suspicion of acts forbidden in Islam.

Education

Literacy rates (percentage of people over 15 who can read and write) are high in Malaysia, with an overall Literacy rate of 88.7%. Literacy rates are higher among males (92%) than females (85.4%)

Education in Malaysia is monitored by the federal government Ministry of Education. The education system features a non-compulsory kindergarten education followed by six years of compulsory primary education, and five years of optional secondary education. Most Malaysian children start schooling between the ages of three to six, in kindergarten.

Primary education
Children begin primary schooling at the age of seven for a period of six years. Primary schools are divided into two categories, national primary schools and vernacular school. Vernacular schools (Sekolah Jenis Kebangsaan) use either Chinese or Tamil as the medium of instruction, whereas national primary schools (Sekolah Kebangsaan) uses Bahasa Malaysia as the medium of instruction for subjects except English, Science and Mathematics.

Before progressing to the secondary level of education, pupils in Year 6 are required to sit the Primary School Achievement Test (Ujian Pencapaian Sekolah Rendah, UPSR). A programme called First Level Assessment (Penilaian Tahap Satu, PTS) taken during Primary Year 3 was abolished in 2001.

Secondary education
Secondary education in Malaysia is conducted in secondary schools (Sekolah Menengah Kebangsaan) for five years. National secondary schools use Malay as the main language of instruction. The only exceptions are Mathematics and Science and languages other than Malay, however this was only implemented in 2003, prior to which all non-language subjects were taught in Malay. At the end of Form Three, which is the third year, students are evaluated in the Form Three Assessment ("Pentaksiran Tingkatan Tiga", PT3). Secondary students no longer sit for PMR in Form Three that has been abolished in 2014. In the final year of secondary education (Form Five), students sit the Malaysian Certificate of Education (Sijil Pelajaran Malaysia, SPM) examination, which is equivalent to the former British Ordinary or 'O' Levels. The government has decided to abandon the use of English in teaching maths and science and revert to Bahasa Malaysia, starting in 2012.

Malaysian national secondary schools are sub-divided into several types: National Secondary School (Sekolah Menengah Kebangsaan), Religious Secondary School (Sekolah Menengah Agama), National-Type Secondary School (Sekolah Menengah Jenis Kebangsaan) (also referred to as Mission Schools), Technical Schools (Sekolah Menengah Teknik), Residential Schools and MARA Junior Science College (Maktab Rendah Sains MARA).

There are also 60 Chinese Independent High Schools in Malaysia, where most subjects are taught in Chinese. Chinese Independent High Schools are monitored and standardised by the United Chinese School Committees' Association of Malaysia (UCSCAM). However, unlike government schools, independent schools are autonomous. It takes six years to complete secondary education in Chinese independent schools. Students will sit a standardised test conducted by UCSCAM, which is known as the Unified Examination Certificate (UEC) in Junior Middle 3 (equivalent to PMR) and Senior Middle 3 (equivalent to A level). A number of independent schools conduct classes in Malay and English in addition to Chinese, enabling the students to sit the PMR and SPM additionally.

Tertiary education

Before the introduction of the matriculation system, students aiming to enter public universities had to complete an additional 18 months of secondary schooling in Form Six and sit the Malaysian Higher School Certificate (Sijil Tinggi Persekolahan Malaysia, STPM); equivalent to the British Advanced or 'A' levels. Since the introduction of the matriculation programme as an alternative to STPM in 1999, students who completed the 12-month programme in matriculation colleges (kolej matrikulasi in Malay) can enrol in local universities. However, in the matriculation system, only 10 per cent of the places are open to non-Bumiputra students.

There are a number of government-funded public universities in Malaysia, the most prominent of them being University of Malaya. Although the ethnic quota system favouring Malays at such universities was abolished in 2002, disparity of student intake still exists in these universities with underrepresentation of non-Bumiputras. Instead, private universities have sprung up to cater to the local population.  These private universities are also gaining a reputation for international quality education and students from all over the world attend these universities. In addition, four reputable international universities have set up their branch campuses in Malaysia since 1998. A branch campus can be seen as an 'offshore campus' of the foreign university, which offers the same courses and awards as the main campus. Both local and international students can acquire these identical foreign qualifications in Malaysia at a lower fee. The foreign university branch campuses in Malaysia are: Monash University Malaysia Campus, Curtin University, Malaysia, Swinburne University of Technology Sarawak Campus and University of Nottingham Malaysia Campus.

Students also have the option of enrolling in private tertiary institutions after secondary studies. Most institutions have educational links with overseas universities especially in the United States, the United Kingdom and Australia, allowing students to spend a portion of their course duration abroad as well as getting overseas qualifications. One such example is Tunku Abdul Rahman University College which partnered with Sheffield Hallam University and Coventry University.

International schools

In addition to the Malaysian National Curriculum, Malaysia has many international schools such as The International School Kuala Lumpur, Alice Smith School, Gardens International School, Cempaka Schools Malaysia, Kolej Tuanku Ja'afar...etc. These schools cater to the growing expatriate population in the country and the Malaysians who want a foreign curriculum, UK based curriculum, English education or Australian curriculum as well.

Health

The Malaysian government places importance on the expansion and development of health care, putting 5% of the government social sector development budget into public health care—an increase of more than 47% over the previous figure. This has meant an overall increase of more than RM 2 billion. With a rising and ageing population, the Government wishes to improve in many areas including the refurbishment of existing hospitals, building and equipping new hospitals, expansion of the number of polyclinics, and improvements in training and expansion of telehealth. A major problem with the health care sector is the lack of medical centres for rural areas, which the government is trying to counter through the development of and expansion of a system called "tele-primary care". Another issue is the overprescription of drugs, though this has decreased in recent years. Since 2009 the Malaysian Health Ministry has increased its efforts to overhaul the system and attract more foreign investment.

The country generally has an efficient and widespread system of health care. It implements a universal healthcare system, which co-exists with the private healthcare system. Infant mortality rate in 2009 was 6 deaths per 1000 births, and life expectancy at birth in 2009 was 75 years. Malaysia has the highest levels of obesity among ASEAN countries.

The Malaysian health care system requires doctors to perform a compulsory three years service with public hospitals to ensure that the manpower in these hospitals is maintained. Recently foreign doctors have also been encouraged to take up employment in Malaysia. There is still, however, a significant shortage in the medical workforce, especially of highly trained specialists; thus, certain medical care and treatment are available only in large cities. Recent efforts to bring many facilities to other towns have been hampered by lack of expertise to run the available equipment.

The majority of private hospitals are in urban areas and, unlike many of the public hospitals, are equipped with the latest diagnostic and imaging facilities. Private hospitals have not generally been seen as an ideal investment—it has often taken up to ten years before companies have seen any profits. However, the situation has now changed and companies are now exploring this area again, corresponding with the increased number of foreigners entering Malaysia for medical care and the recent government focus on developing the health tourism industry. The Government has also been trying to promote Malaysia as a health care destination, regionally and internationally.

Major cities

Kuala Lumpur is the capital and largest city of Malaysia. Although many executive and judicial branches of the federal government have moved to Putrajaya, Kuala Lumpur is the seat of the Parliament of Malaysia, making it the country's legislative capital. It is also the economic and business centre of the country, and is a primate city. Kuala Lumpur is also rated as a global city, and is the only global city in Malaysia. Along with Subang Jaya, Klang, Petaling Jaya, Shah Alam, Kajang-Sungai Chua, Ampang Jaya and Selayang it forms the country's largest and most important urban area, the Klang Valley.

George Town, the capital city of Penang, is the second largest city, with nearly 710,000 inhabitants as of 2010. It used to be Malaysia's largest and only city until the 1970s when Kuala Lumpur became the capital. Today, the city serves as the economic, financial, logistics and medical tourism hub in the northern region of Malaysia. Together with the surrounding towns including Butterworth, Sungai Petani, Kulim, Bandar Baharu and Parit Buntar, it forms Greater Penang, the nation's second largest conurbation with a population of about 2.5 million.

The third largest urban area in Malaysia is situated at the country's southern end, comprising the twin cities of Johor Bahru and Iskandar Puteri, along with Pasir Gudang and Kulai. Located next to Singapore, it is also an important industrial, tourism and commercial hub for southern Malaysia.

Other major cities in Malaysia include Ipoh, Kota Kinabalu and Kuching.

See also 
 Immigration to Malaysia
 Project IC, corruption & electoral demographics

References

External links
 Department of Statistics, Malaysia